Stumpknocker may refer to:

One of various edible freshwater fish, especially the spotted sunfish or redspotted sunfish
 Stump Knocker Pale Ale, produced by Swamp Head Brewery